Craig Hoyer (born 6 September 1960) is a former Australian rules footballer who played with Hawthorn in the Victorian Football League (VFL).

Hoyer was a ruckman, originally from Redcliffe, who had played three seasons with Swan Districts before joining Hawthorn. The Western Australian was restricted to just four senior games for Hawthorn.He returned home in 1984 to play again at Swan Districts but after a year he was on the move again, signing with the Hobart Football Club for the 1985 season. In both 1986 and 1987, Hoyer won Hobart's "Best and Fairest" award and came runner-up in the 1986 William Leitch Medal to Andy Bennett from Sandy Bay. Hoyer left Hobart at the end of the 1988 season and joined the Devonport Blues for the 1989 season, and was chosen to represent Tasmania against Victoria during the 1989 State of Origin match, unfortunately Hoyer was ineligible to play due to suspension. Hoyer suffered a badly broken leg during the 1990 season before returning for his final season in 1991. Hoyer then moved to Lauderdale Football Club in the STFL where he played and coached over a number of successful years before moving to the Kingston Tigers in 1995 under Scott Wade in which they played together at Hawthorn & Hobart. Kingston where Premiers at the conclusion of the 1995 season. Hoyer went on to win another Premiership at Kingston at the conclusion of the 1997 season under former Cartlon & Fitzroy player, Leigh McConnon.

References

1960 births
Australian rules footballers from Western Australia
Hawthorn Football Club players
Swan Districts Football Club players
Hobart Football Club players
Devonport Football Club players
Living people